Rock & Roll Madness is the second album by American rock group Ruby, featuring Tom Fogerty.

Track listing
 "Run with Your Love"
 "Mistreater"
 "Take a Little More Time"
 "Make Love to You"
 "Evergreen in Mexico"
 "It's Gotta Be You"
 "Take Me Higher"
 "Singin' the Blues"
 "King Arthur's March"
 "Dance All Night"

Personnel
 Tom Fogerty – guitar, vocals
 Randy Oda – guitar, keyboards, vocals
 Anthony Davis – bass, vocals
 Bobby Cochran – drums, vocals

References

Tom Fogerty albums
1978 albums